Karol Beck was the defending champion but decided not to participate.

Denis Istomin won the final 6–4, 6–3 against Jürgen Zopp and claimed the title.

Seeds

Draw

Finals

Top half

Bottom half

References
 Main Draw
 Qualifying Draw

2011 ATP Challenger Tour
2011 Singles